The '''Rip Curl Pro 2016 (Woman) 2016''' was an event of the Association of Surfing Professionals for 2016 World Surf League.

This event was held from 24 march to 7 April at Bells Beach, (Victoria, Australia) and contested by 36 surfers.

The tournament was won by C.Conlogue (USA), who beat Sally Fitzgibbons (AUS) in final.

Round 1

Round 2

Round 3

Round 4

Quarter finals

Semi finals

Final

References

Surfing competitions in Australia
2016 World Surf League
2016 in Australian sport
2016 in Australian women's sport
Sports competitions in Victoria (Australia)
Women's surfing